"The End of the World" is a pop song written by composer Arthur Kent and lyricist Sylvia Dee, who often worked as a team. They wrote the song for American singer Skeeter Davis, and her recording of it was highly successful in the early 1960s, reaching the top five on four different charts, including  on the main Billboard Hot 100. It spawned many cover versions.

Background
"The End of the World" is a sad song about the aftermath of a romantic breakup. Dee, the lyricist, said she drew on her sorrow from her father's death to set the mood for the song.

Davis recorded her version with sound engineer Bill Porter on June 8, 1962, at the RCA Studios in Nashville, produced by Chet Atkins, and featuring Floyd Cramer. Released by RCA Records in December 1962, "The End of the World" peaked in March 1963 at No. 2 on the Billboard Hot 100 (behind "Our Day Will Come" by Ruby & the Romantics), No. 2 on Billboards Hot Country Singles chart, No. 1 on Billboards Easy Listening chart, and No. 4 on Billboards Hot R&B Singles chart. It is the first, and, to date, only time that a song cracked the Top 10 (and Top 5) on all four Billboard charts. Billboard ranked the record as the No. 2 song of 1963.

In the Davis version, after she sings the whole song through in the key of B-flat-major, the song modulates up by a half step to the key of B, where Davis speaks the first two lines of the final stanza, before singing the rest of the stanza, ending the song.

"The End of the World" was played at Atkins' funeral in an instrumental by Marty Stuart. The song was also played at Davis's own funeral at the Ryman Auditorium. Her version has been featured in several films, TV shows, and video games (see "Appearances in media" below).

Chart performance

Covers

Sonia version

In 1990, English singer Sonia covered "End of the World". The fifth and final single from her debut album, Everybody Knows, it reached number 18 in the UK, the same chart position as the original. The single's B-side "Can't Help the Way That I Feel" also appeared on Sonia's debut album. This was her final single with Stock Aitken Waterman.

Charts

Other notable versions
In June 1965 during the height of the British Invasion, English pop group Herman's Hermits released their cover of the song as a B-side on their international hit 
"I'm Henry VIII, I Am" with a slower tempo. Despite its success, the single was not released in the UK. Derek Leckenby's distinctive lead guitar cadences were achieved by using a volume pedal, an experimental technique possibly influenced by The Beatles song "Yes It Is". This version was included on the band's debut album Herman's Hermits and on their second North American album Herman's Hermits on Tour, both from that same year.

During the summer of 1966, Swedish pop group  recorded the song. Released as a single in August of that year, it was backed by the song "Whitsand Bay" written by Wallace, based on the tourist destination he'd often visited. It became a hit on Tio i Topp, entering the chart on August 6, 1966 at a position of number five. It topped the chart on August 27, staying on the top for a week. It exited the chart on October 29, at a position of number 14, having spent 13 weeks on the chart. On sales chart Kvällstoppen, it entered on August 16, 1966 at a position of 18. It would reach its peak of number two on September 6, being kept off the top by the Beatles "Yellow Submarine". It exited on November 8, at a position of 18, having spent 13 weeks on the chart.

To capitalize on the Caretakers version, Anna-Lena Löfgren recorded the song in Swedish, as "Allt är förbi", scoring a Svensktoppen hit for seven weeks between 9 October–19 November 1966. 

A version by Allison Paige peaked at number 72 on the Billboard Hot Country Singles & Tracks chart in May 2000.

Nina Gordon, formerly of Veruca Salt, also covered the song on her 2000 album Tonight and the Rest of My Life.

The Band Girls released a cover on an expanded version of their album Album in 2009.

Appearances in media
 The song is featured in the 1960s period drama film Girl, Interrupted (1999)
 The song appears in the 2005 movie Daltry Calhoun, starring Johnny Knoxville
 The song is played during episode 9 ("What Kate Did") of the second season of Lost, .
 The song appears at the end of episode 12 ("The Grown-Ups") of the third season of Mad Men
 The song is used as the opening and closing theme for the 2012 political thriller radio drama Pandemic, produced by BBC Radio 4.
 The version by Herman's Hermits is played during the closing scene of the third episode of The Queen’s Gambit.
 The song is featured in the Japanese post-apocalyptic film Attack on Titan: End of the World.
Patti Smith's cover is played during the end credits of the 2017 film Mother!.
A version is played at the end of episode 9 ("The Most Powerful Man in the World (and His Identical Twin Brother)") of the third season of the HBO show, The Leftovers.
 The song is featured in the 2021 Marvel Studios's Eternals (film).
 The song is featured on Bethesda Softworks game Fallout 4's in-game radio and was also used in one of the game's promotional trailers.
 The song is used at the end of the episode 8 of the first season of The End Of The F***ing World.
 The song is used diegetically in the 2017 short film Black Eyed Susan, which stars Denise Welch and her son, Louis Healy.
 The song plays in the 2022 film Don't Worry Darling.

References

1962 singles
1963 singles
1990 singles
Skeeter Davis songs
Sonia (singer) songs
Songs with lyrics by Sylvia Dee
Torch songs
1962 songs
Song recordings produced by Chet Atkins
Song recordings produced by Stock Aitken Waterman
RCA Victor singles
Chrysalis Records singles
A&M Records singles
King Records (Japan) singles
Universal Music Group singles
Songs with music by Arthur Kent (composer)
Number-one singles in Sweden